Abaidullah Khan, known as A. U. Khan, was a three-star rank admiral in the Pakistan Navy, and later a bureaucrat who played a crucial role in procuring and technology transfer of the air-independent propulsion-based Agosta 90Bravo class submarine from France in 1994–1997.

Biography

Abaidullah Khan was born in 1940 in Kashmir, now part of India and Pakistan, and was commissioned in the Navy in 1958 as Midshipman with S/No. PN. 775 in the Executive Branch. He was of the Kashmiri Pathan descent who lost both of his parents at the age of nine during the Indian partition and the first war with India in 1947, and was cared in the foster home.
 
He later joined the Submarine Command and was trained in PNS Hangor in France in 1966–1969. In 1971, Lt-Cdr. A.U. Khan was serving as the second-in-command of PNS Hangor, when it was deployed in Arabian sea, serving on the western front of the third war with India in 1971. Together with Lt. Fasih Bokhari, Lt-Cdr. Khan was instrumental in the control room to identify the exact coordinates and positions of Indian warships that ultimately sank INS Khurki under the command of Capt. M.N. Mulla.

After the war, Lt-Cdr. Khan was honored with the gallantry award and was directed to attend the course on War studies at the Islamabad, eventually gaining MSc in war studies in 1980.

In 1980s, Cdre. A.U. Khan commanded the Squadron as its officer in tactical command. Cdre. Khan was later attached as a Naval attache' to the Royal Navy at the High Commission of Pakistan in London in the United Kingdom.

In 1993–1994, Rear-Admiral A.U. Khan was promoted as a fleet commander, Commander Pakistan Fleet, where he was instrumental in providing the strong advocacy for acquiring the whole squadron of the Type-21 frigates from the Royal Navy, attending the ceremony with British Vice Admiral Roy Newman, the Flag Officer Plymouth, who handed over the Ambuscade that was designated as Tariq as the lead ship. In 1994, R-Adm. Khan took over the command of the Submarine Command and was posted as the DCNS (Operations) at the Navy NHQ.

In 1994, Adm. Saeed Mohammad Khan selected R-Adm. Khan as the head of the second team that visited France while the first team under R-Adm. Javed Iftikhar visited United Kingdom to acquire the imported submarines. It was reported in media that R-Adm A.U. Khan provided his strong lobbying and advocacy for acquiring the AIP technology from France through the technology transfer rather than acquiring the Upholder from the United Kingdom. R-Adm. Khan who was trained in French submarine had played a pivotal role in convincing the government of acquiring the AIP technology from France on a long-term strategic view, and this extremely controversial contract was eventually signed in 1994 with France despite Adm. Saeed Mohammad Khan's urgings.

In 1995, Vice-Admiral Khan was elevated as Vice Chief of Naval Staff, and was taken as secondment by the Benazir administration as a chairman of the National Shipping Corporation (PNSC) in 1996, which he served through service extension until 2000 when he retired from his 42 year long military service.

In 2001–02, V-Adm. A.U. Khan was placed in Exit Control List by the Ministry of Interior due to his leading role in negotiating the deal to procure the technology of the  Agosta–90Bravo class submarines, though his name was immediately cleared out by the government, citing mistakes.

In 2018, V-Adm. Khan participated as a chief guest the in celebration "to honor the submarine to eulogize the events in 1971", while inspecting the submarine museum, Pakistan Naval Museum in Karachi.

See also
Chief of Naval Staff (Pakistan)

References

1940 births
Pashtun people
Kashmiri people
People from Jammu and Kashmir
Orphanages in India
Graduates of Britannia Royal Naval College
École Navale alumni
Submariners
Pakistani military personnel of the Indo-Pakistani War of 1971
French–Urdu translators
Pakistan Navy admirals
Recipients of Sitara-i-Imtiaz
Recipients of Hilal-i-Imtiaz
2001 controversies
Living people